Walter Herssens (15 February 1930 – 14 January 1992) was a Belgian decathlete.

He competed for his country at the 1952 Summer Olympics in Helsinki, Finland 'where he competed in the high jump and triple jump finishing in 29th and 33rd respectively.  He returned four years later to the 1956 Summer Olympics where he competed in the triple jump  finishing 29th and pulling out of the decathlon..

External links
 Sports-reference.com

1930 births
1992 deaths
Belgian decathletes
Belgian male triple jumpers
Belgian male high jumpers
Athletes (track and field) at the 1952 Summer Olympics
Athletes (track and field) at the 1956 Summer Olympics
Olympic athletes of Belgium
20th-century Belgian people